Munnettam is a 1981 Indian Malayalam-language film, directed by Sreekumaran Thampi and produced by S. Kumar. The film stars Mammootty, Sumalatha, Ratheesh, Menaka and Jalaja . The film has musical score by Shyam. This is a remake of the successful Tamil movie Bhuvana Oru Kelvi Kuri

Cast
Mammootty as Rajappan
Ratheesh as Chandran
Menaka as Indhu
Jalaja as Janu
Sumalatha
Adoor Bhasi
Prathapachandran
Baby Ponnambili
Jagathy sreekumar as Gopy

Soundtrack
The music was composed by Shyam and the lyrics were written by Sreekumaran Thampi. Unni Menon became popular for singing songs in this film.

References

External links
 

1981 films
1980s Malayalam-language films
Films directed by Sreekumaran Thampi
Films scored by Shyam (composer)